A layered account is a form of qualitative social research in which the researcher writes from more than one voice and is informed by several layers of consciousness.  First proposed by Carol Rambo Ronai, a layered account intentionally blurs the boundaries between social research and art.

See also
 Autoethnography

Qualitative research